Loan Bozzolo (born 4 May 1999) is a French snowboarder who specializes in snowboard cross. He competed in the 2018 Winter Olympics.

Early life
Bozzolo was raised in Saint-Gervais-les-Bains. He began skiing at the age of two and started snowboarding at the age of five.

Career
Bozzolo began competing in snowboard cross as a junior in 2014. His first race was at the European Cup in Pitztal, where he finished 49th overall. His first win as a junior was in Grasgehren in 2016.

In 2018, Bozzolo was selected to compete for France at the 2018 Winter Olympics in the snowboard cross. He qualified from his heat in third place. However, he failed to finish in his Quarterfinal race, putting him out of the competition.

Bozzolo won European Cup races in 2019 in both Lenk and Sunny Valley. At the FIS Snowboard Cross Junior World Championships, Bozzolo won the men's event, beating Éliot Grondin of Canada, and also won the mixed team competition alongside Chloe Passerat.

Bozzolo competed for France at the 2022 Winter Olympics in the snowboard cross. He qualified from his heat in second place. However, he was eliminated in the quarterfinals, finishing third in his race.

References

External links
 

1999 births
Living people
Snowboarders at the 2018 Winter Olympics
Snowboarders at the 2022 Winter Olympics
French male snowboarders
Olympic snowboarders of France
21st-century French people